is a city located in Ishikawa Prefecture, Japan. , the city had an estimated population of 108,509 in 42,664 households, and a population density of 290 persons per km².

Geography
Komatsu is located in southwestern Ishikawa Prefecture in the Hokuriku region of Japan and is bordered by the Sea of Japan to the east and Fukui Prefecture to the south. It is located about an hour driving distance southwest from Kanazawa (the capital of Ishikawa Prefecture).

Neighbouring municipalities 
Ishikawa Prefecture
Kaga
Hakusan
Nomi
Fukui Prefecture
Katsuyama

Climate
Komatsu has a humid continental climate (Köppen Cfa) characterized by mild summers and cold winters with heavy snowfall.  The average annual temperature in Komatsu is 14.3 °C. The average annual rainfall is 2521 mm with September as the wettest month. The temperatures are highest on average in August, at around 26.8 °C, and lowest in January, at around 2.9 °C.

Demographics
Per Japanese census data, the population of Komatsu peaked around the year 2000 and has declined slightly since.

History 
The area around Komatsu was part of ancient Kaga Province. The area became part Kaga Domain under the Edo period Tokugawa shogunate. Komatsu housed the retirement castle of Maeda Toshitsune. In the spring, this is one of the prefecture's best spots for cherry blossom viewing. Following the Meiji restoration, the area was organised into Nomi District, Ishikawa. The town of Komatsu was established with the creation of the modern municipalities system on April 1, 1889. Komatsu merged with surrounding municipalities to become a city on December 1, 1940.

Government
Komatsu has a mayor-council form of government with a directly elected mayor and a unicameral city legislature of 22 members.

Economy 
Komatsu was traditionally known for the production of Kutani ware ceramics and for silk. Komatsu Limited, the Japanese multinational construction and mining equipment corporation, was founded in Komatsu in 1921.

Education
Komatsu has 26 public elementary schools and ten middle schools operated by the city government, and five public high schools operated by the Ishikawa Prefectural Board of Education and one by the city government. There is also one private high school. Komatsu College, a private junior college is also located in Komatsu.

Transportation

Railway
 West Japan Railway Company - Hokuriku Main Line
 Awazu - Komatsu - Meihō

Highway
 Hokuriku Expressway

Airport
Komatsu Airport

Sister city relations
 - Suzano, São Paulo, Brazil, since July 11, 1972 
 - Vilvoorde, Flemish Brabant, Belgium,  since May 15, 1974
 - Gateshead, Tyne and Wear, UK, since August 2, 1991
 - Jining, Shandong, China since September 5, 2008
 - Guilin, Guangxi, China, friendship city
 - Changnyeong County, South Gyeongsang, South Korea, friendship city
 - Angarsk, Irkutsk Oblast, Russia, friendship city, since November 13, 2017
 - Changhua, Taiwan, friendship city, since October 10, 2017

Local attractions

Site of the Komatsu Castle
Nata-dera Buddhist temple complex
Yunokuni-no-mori traditional handicrafts village
Hoshi Ryokan (claimed to be world's second oldest hotel)
Motorcar Museum of Japan, the largest museum dedicated to motor vehicles in Japan with a 12,000 square metre display area
Awazu Onsen, a hot spring resort

External links

References

 
Cities in Ishikawa Prefecture
Populated coastal places in Japan